Abdabad (also Romanized as ‘Abdābād; also known as Abdol Ābād) is a village in Roqicheh Rural District, Kadkan District, Torbat-e Heydarieh County, Razavi Khorasan Province, Iran. At the 2006 census, its population was 366, in 101 families.

See also 

 List of cities, towns and villages in Razavi Khorasan Province

References 

Populated places in Torbat-e Heydarieh County